The 1979 Southern 500, the 30th running of the event, was a NASCAR Winston Cup Series race that took place on September 3, 1979, at Darlington Raceway in Darlington, South Carolina.

This would be the last race without Dale Earnhardt until 2001 Dura Lube 400, and the last in not featuring the name Earnhardt on the starting grid until the 2012 Bank of America 500.

Background
Darlington Raceway, nicknamed by many NASCAR fans and drivers as "The Lady in Black" or "The Track Too Tough to Tame" and advertised as a "NASCAR Tradition", is a race track built for NASCAR racing located near Darlington, South Carolina. It is of a unique, somewhat egg-shaped design, an oval with the ends of very different configurations, a condition which supposedly arose from the proximity of one end of the track to a minnow pond the owner refused to relocate. This situation makes it very challenging for the crews to set up their cars' handling in a way that will be effective at both ends.

The track is a four-turn  oval. The track's first two turns are banked at twenty-five degrees, while the final two turns are banked two degrees lower at twenty-three degrees. The front stretch (the location of the finish line) and the back stretch is banked at six degrees. Darlington Raceway can seat up to 60,000 people.

Darlington has something of a legendary quality among drivers and older fans; this is probably due to its long track length relative to other NASCAR speedways of its era and hence the first venue where many of them became cognizant of the truly high speeds that stock cars could achieve on a long track. The track allegedly earned the moniker The Lady in Black because the night before the race the track maintenance crew would cover the entire track with fresh asphalt sealant, in the early years of the speedway, thus making the racing surface dark black. Darlington is also known as "The Track Too Tough to Tame" because drivers can run lap after lap without a problem and then bounce off of the wall the following lap. Racers will frequently explain that they have to race the racetrack, not their competition. Drivers hitting the wall are considered to have received their "Darlington Stripe" thanks to the missing paint on the right side of the car.

Race report
The total time of the race was three hours, fifty-eight minutes, and fourteen seconds. There were nine cautions for fifty-two laps.

David Pearson, who was in semi-retirement and had left the Wood Brothers after a disastrous pit stop at the Rebel 500 earlier that year, was driving for Rod Osterlund as a substitute for rookie contender Dale Earnhardt, injured at the Pocono race, defeated Bill Elliott by two laps and four seconds.

This was David Pearson's first win in a General Motors car since he won the 1961 Dixie 400 in a Pontiac and the first of just two for him at the wheel of a Chevrolet. Pearson's victory also marked the last of only nine starts for David Pearson in 1979. While he wasn't a familiar sight on the track this season the Silver Fox was still selected by fans as the Cup Series' Most Popular Driver at year's end. Ironically this was only time in Pearson's career he won that honor. This would be one of the final races in NASCAR history that a racing car without a visible sponsor won. In today's NASCAR, most drivers have a primary sponsor and a secondary sponsor due to the amount of money spent on racing components in a given season.

Sixty thousand people came to watch this live event.

Darrell Waltrip had controlled the race until late-race incidents that dropped him to 11th, which ended his shot at sweeping the track's two races. Waltrip would not be considered a good competitor at Darlington for most of his career, despite four Rebel 500 wins (1977, 1979, 1981 and 1984). He would typically dominate the early portions of the race during the 1970s before an incident would force him out of contention for the win. Those late-race incidents would later cause Waltrip to lose the 1979 championship to Richard Petty. The top prize of the race was $29,925 ($ when considering inflation).

The participants of this race were all American-born males. With the lone Chrysler of Ed Negre and H.B. Bailey's lone Pontiac, this was the last Cup race with eight car makes in the starting lineup. Ed Negre would make his final appearance here while Billy Smith would make his only professional stock car appearance. Notable crew chiefs who participated in the race were Buddy Parrott, Tex Powell, Joey Arrington, Kirk Shelmerdine, Darrell Bryant, Dale Inman, Harry Hyde, and Jake Elder.

Hurricane David approached the East Coast of the United States during the course of the race. The storm had made landfall in Eastern Florida while the drivers were racing.

Qualifying

Withdrew from race: Jan Opperman (#96)

Finishing order
Section reference:

 David Pearson†
 Bill Elliott
 Terry Labonte
 Buddy Baker†
 Benny Parsons†
 Dave Marcis
 Dick Brooks†
 Ricky Rudd
 Richard Petty
 Bobby Allison
 Darrell Waltrip
 Harry Gant
 D. K. Ulrich
 Buddy Arrington
 Joe Millikan
 Jimmy Means
 Chuck Bown
 J. D. McDuffie†
 Cale Yarborough
 Ed Negre†
 Tommy Gale†
 Frank Warren
 Baxter Price
 Ronnie Thomas
 Lennie Pond†
 Cecil Gordon†
 H. B. Bailey*†
 Jim Vandiver†
 Richard Childress*
 Jack Ingram*
 Donnie Allison*
 Neil Bonnett*†
 Billy Smith*
 Dick May*†
 Tighe Scott*
 Coo Coo Marlin*†
 Ralph Jones*
 James Hylton*†
 Earle Canavan*
 Ferrel Harris*†

† signifies that the driver is known to be deceased 
* Driver failed to finish race

Timeline
Section reference:
 Start of race: Donnie Allison had the pole position to begin the event.
 Lap 2: Ferrel Harris was black-flagged out of the race and into a last-place finish.
 Lap 17: An oil leak in Earle Canavan's vehicle managed to ruin his day on the track.
 Lap 27: Bobby Allison took over the lead from Donnie Allison.
 Lap 46: James Hylton's vehicle developed engine problems.
 Lap 56: Caution due to Harry Gant and Joe Millikan's accident; racing resumed on lap 62.
 Lap 63: Darrell Waltrip took over the lead from Bobby Allison.
 Lap 69: Caution due to Bobby Allison's accident; racing resumed on lap 72.
 Lap 83: Caution due to two cars spinning into each other; racing resumed on lap 88.
 Lap 84: Donnie Allison took over the lead from Darrell Waltrip.
 Lap 90: Caution due to a vehicle spinning out of control; racing resumed on lap 92.
 Lap 112: Coo Coo Marlin had engine problems which ending his hopes of winning the event.
 Lap 116: Caution due to a vehicle spinning out of control; racing resumed on lap 121.
 Lap 117: Bobby Allison took over the lead from Donnie Allison.
 Lap 118: Bill Elliott took over the lead from Bobby Allison.
 Lap 122: Donnie Allison took over the lead from Bill Elliott.
 Lap 133: Tighe Scott had a terminal crash; forcing him to leave the race prematurely.
 Lap 138: Darrell Waltrip took over the lead from Donnie Allison.
 Lap 142: Caution due to two cars spinning into each other; racing resumed on lap 149.
 Lap 143: Donnie Allison took over the lead from Darrell Waltrip.
 Lap 148: Dick May had a terminal crash; forcing him to exit the race.
 Lap 150: Darrell Waltrip took over the lead from Donnie Allison.
 Lap 160: Caution due to a vehicle spinning out of control; racing resumed on lap 165.
 Lap 161: Buddy Baker took over the lead from Darrell Waltrip.
 Lap 162: Bill Elliott took over the lead from Buddy Baker.
 Lap 164: Darrell Waltrip took over the Bill Elliott.
 Lap 166: Neil Bonnett took over the lead from Darrell Waltrip.
 Lap 168: Darrell Waltrip took over the lead from Neil Bonnett.
 Lap 179: Driveshaft issues managed to force Billy Smith out of the race.
 Lap 185: Steering issues managed to get the best of Neil Bonnett.
 Lap 196: Donnie Allison's engine would stop working properly; causing his early exit from the race.
 Lap 206: Jack Ingram's vehicle developed engine problems.
 Lap 224: Richard Childress' engine problem forced his early exit from the race.
 Lap 231: David Pearson took over the lead from Darrell Waltrip.
 Lap 235: Darrell Waltrip took over the lead from David Pearson.
 Lap 244: H.B. Bailey managed to overheat his vehicle; securing an unwanted early exit from the event.
 Lap 296: Caution due to Darrell Waltrip's accident; racing resumed on lap 303.
 Lap 298: David Pearson took over the lead from Darrell Waltrip and would dominate the remainder of the race.
 Lap 306: Caution due to a vehicle spinning out of control; racing resumed on lap 309.
 Finish: David Pearson was officially declared the winner of the event.

Standings after the race

References

Southern 500
Southern 500
NASCAR races at Darlington Raceway